Tayun may refer to:
 Tayun, Fars
 Tayun, Lorestan (disambiguation)